Keriorrhea is the production of greasy, orange-colored stools which results from the consumption of indigestible wax esters found in oilfish and escolar.

See also 
 Steatorrhea
 Rectal discharge

References

Feces
Diarrhea
Gastrointestinal tract disorders
Steatorrhea-related diseases